Jornal da Cultura (Culture News) is a long-running Brazilian TV program currently running on TV Cultura. It hosts many notable Brazilian figures and intellectuals, such as the historian Marco Antonio Villa, the philosopher Luiz Felipe Pondé, the physician Paulo Saldiva, and many other economists, philosophers and notable individuals. It first aired on 29 December 1986 under the direction of Hamilton Tramontá. Currently, the program is hosted by the brazilian TV Host Willian Corrêa. On the normal schedule, the TV Program runs everyday except for weekends.

Guests
Every day of the week, the program invites at least two academic guests to discuss openly about diverse subjects and topics. Known figures such as Carlos Novaes, Demétrio Magnoli, Maristela Basso, Ricardo Abramovay, Vladimir Safatle, Alexandre Schwartsman, Ethevaldo Siqueira, Mario Sergio Cortella and Paulo Lins have appeared on the show. Notable ones who are often on the program include:

Leandro Karnal - historian
Luiz Felipe Pondé - philosopher
Luiz Flávio Gomes - jurist
Marco Antonio Villa - historian
Paulo Saldiva - physician

External links

Brazilian television news shows
1986 Brazilian television series debuts
Portuguese-language television shows